Yellow cab taxicab operators exist all around the world (some with common heritage, some without). The original Yellow Cab Company, based in Chicago, Illinois, was one of the largest taxicab companies in the United States.

History 

Yellow cabs date back to at least 1798, when the musical comedy, Cabriolet Jaune (Yellow Cab), debuted at Paris' Theatre de l’Opera Comique National.  Yellow cabs were known in Paris and London throughout most of the 1800s.  A yellow cab company shook up the New York Cab system in the mid-1880s, offering cheaper, more predictable fares than competitors.  One of the first automobile cabs in London, in the 1890s, was a yellow electric automobile.

The Yellow Cab Company of Chicago was founded by John D. Hertz in 1907. Their specially designed taxicabs were powered by a 4-cylinder Continental engine equipped with a purpose-built taxicab body supplied by the Racine Body Co., of Racine, Wisconsin. According to Yellow Cab Co. tradition, the color (and name) yellow was selected by John Hertz as the result of a survey he commissioned at a "local university", which indicated it was the easiest color to spot.  However, "he was certainly not the first taxicab operator to use that color and the university study to which B. C. Forbes refers has yet to be discovered."  In 2017, a study showed that the color yellow, for taxis, was more noticeable, resulting in 9% fewer accidents.

In 1908, Albert Rockwell, founder and General Manager of the New Departure Manufacturing Co. of Bristol, Connecticut, travelled to Europe to evaluate their taxi systems, hoping to develop a similar one in Washington, D.C. Ernest Wyckoff, Alfred Church and Clarence Partridge, well-known automobile dealers in New York, had a number of orange-yellow colored Rockwell taxicabs operating on Manhattan streets in 1909. By March 1910, the Connecticut Cab Co. (essentially the directors of New Departure Manufacturing Co.) assumed operating control of Wyckoff, Church and Partridge's taxis.

The Yellow Taxicab Co. was incorporated in New York on April 4, 1912. Its fares that year started at 50¢/mile (roughly equivalent to $12.12 in 2016 adjusted for inflation). Among its directors and major stockholders were Albert Rockwell and the Connecticut Cab Co. Shortly after incorporation the Yellow Taxicab Co. merged with the Cab and Taxi Co., and with the strength of Connecticut Cab Co. behind them, the young business assumed a large share of the New York market. Its independent corporate life was fairly short, however, as fare wars and regulations forced a merger with the Mason-Seaman Transportation Co. on March 3, 1914. Shortly after, an injunction was filed by the company, seeking to restrain the city from enforcing the Public Hack ordinances, but it was rejected on appeal. By 1916, the company was being held in receivership, due to suits by numerous creditors.

The Yellow Cab Manufacturing Company was formed in 1920.

List of cab companies

Australia
 The Yellow Cab Group was founded in 1924 and operates in Queensland and Tasmania.
 Yellow Cabs operate in Melbourne. There all taxi companies have yellow-painted cabs.
 Yellow and Coastal Cabs are in Perth.

Canada
 The Yellow Cab Company of Vancouver, British Columbia was founded in 1921.
 Yellow Cab Company of Toronto, Ontario.
 Yellow Cab of Burlington, Ontario.
 Yellow Cab of Edmonton, Alberta was purchased and given the Yellow name in 1945.
 Yellow Cab of Halifax, was founded in 1962 and is the largest Yellow Cab brand in Atlantic Canada.
Yellow Cab of Victoria, British Columbia, formerly Empress Taxi.

India
 Yellow Cab of Hyderabad, India.
 Yellow Taxi of Kolkata, India.

Singapore
 ComfortDelGro in Singapore.

Spain
 Taxis in Barcelona are yellow and black since 1929. This is a major exception to the rule of taxi colouring in Spain, with taxis of most cities being white.

United States
 The Yellow Cab Company of Baltimore, Maryland, was founded in 1909. It is currently owned by Transdev. (U.S.)
 Yellow Checker Cab of Peoria, Illinois, was founded in 1922 and is the largest taxi fleet in downstate Illinois. (U.S.)
 Yellow Cab Co. in Oklahoma City, Oklahoma was founded in 1918. It ultimately became Yellow Corporation, a major U.S. truck operator. (U.S.)
 The Yellow Cab Cooperative of San Francisco, California, was founded on November 8, 1977, succeeding a failed private company. (U.S.)
 Yellow Cab of San Diego, California, has been in continuous operation since the 1920s. Yellow Cab of San Diego has since sold all of its vehicles; the company operates now as a radio system only. (U.S.)
 California Yellow Cab, serving Orange County, California, has been in operation for over 60 years. It is owned by Keolis. (U.S.)
 Yellow Cab of Arizona, founded in 1967, serving the entire state of Arizona. (U.S.)
 Yellow Cab Co of Bay Area (U.S.)
 Peter Pan Bus Lines was founded as Yellow Cab Air Line in Springfield, Massachusetts, which was purchased in 1933 by Peter Carmen Picknelly (1891-1964) (U.S.)
 Louisville Transportation Company of Louisville, Kentucky, operates as Yellow Cab as well as Checker Cab and Cardinal Cab. Yellow Cab of Louisville has been in continuous operation since 1893, when it was founded as Louisville Carriage Company. (U.S.)
 Yellow Cab Of Buffalo, New York is part of Liberty Cab.
 Los Angeles Yellow Cab

In popular culture 
Yellow cabs are the focus of the film The Yellow Cab Man (1950), starring Red Skelton.

See also
Taxicabs of New York City
Taxicabs of the United States

References

External links 

 "Broadway Dealers Enter Taxicab Field" From The Commercial Vehicle, May 1909 
 Why does every city seem to have a Yellow Cab company? - Cecil Adams, Chicago Reader
 Yellow Cab Comprehensive article on Coachbuilt.com
 Yellow Cab Celebrates 50 Years of "Service to the Public", published in Trips 'n' Tips March 1965 

Taxis of the United States
Taxis